William Urquhart may refer to:

 William Muir Urquhart (1855–1933), American entrepreneur
 William Murray Urquhart known as Billy Urquhart (born 1956), Scottish footballer
 William Spence Urquhart (1877–1964), Scottish minister 
 William Pollard-Urquhart (1815–1871), Irish politician and writer